Qajar coffee (Persian: قهوه قجری, romanized: Qahve-ye Qajari) was a type of poisoned coffee used in the court of Qajar Iran to kill the enemies of the government.

This method of removing opponents became popular especially after the reign of Nasereddin Shah Qajar, notably his son Zellossoltan was notorious in using cyanide, arsenic acid or strychnine poisoned coffee to remove those who opposed him.

Victims 
These people are said to have died by consuming Qajar coffee:

 Agha Reza Khan Eghbalossaltane
 Mirza Agha Khan Nuri, grand vizier
 Mansur Nezam, constitutionalist and tribal leader
 Abolfath Khan
 Mirza Mohammad Khan Sepahsalar, grand vizier
 Hossein Gholi Khan Ilkhani
 Mirza Habibollah Khan Moshirolmolk, politician
 Mirza Ali Khan, Treasurer
 Mirza Mohammad Khan Aminoddole
 Mirza Mohammad Hasan Sheikholeslam, cleric

References 

Poisons
Execution methods
Qajar Iran